JZ-IV-10 is a piperidine derivative related to cocaine which acts as a highly potent serotonin–norepinephrine–dopamine reuptake inhibitor (also called SNDRI, or triple reuptake inhibitor). The eugeroic modafinil was used as a lead to fuel this compound's discovery.

See also 
 1-Methyl-3-propyl-4-(p-chlorophenyl)piperidine
 N,O-Dimethyl-4-(2-naphthyl)piperidine-3-carboxylate
 Nocaine

References 

Stimulants
Carboxamides
4-Phenylpiperidines
Chloroarenes
Serotonin–norepinephrine–dopamine reuptake inhibitors